Dubai Outlet Mall (DOM) is a shopping mall in Dubailand, Dubai, the UAE.Opened in 2007 and is located on the Dubai-Al Ain Road (Route 66) near the Dubai Bypass Road interchange.

Shopping 
The mall houses over 1,200 brands that include Burberry Adidas, Coach, Fred Perry, Mango and Aldo.

Entertainment 

The mall hosts Chuck E. Cheese's a family entertainment venue.

Milestones 
 August 2007 - Dubai Outlet Mall opens
 August 2017 - Dubai Outlet Mall 10th Year Anniversary
 February 2018 - mall announces funding for expansion to increase facilities for shopping, dining, and parking

See also
Dubai Outlet City
Developments in Dubai
List of development projects in Dubai

References

External links
List of shopping stores in Dubai Outlet Mall

Shopping malls established in 2008
Shopping malls in Dubai
Dubailand